Taku Towers is a  double summit mountain located in the Boundary Ranges of the Coast Mountains, in the U.S. state of Alaska. The Taku Range is a north-south trending ridge on the edge of the Taku Glacier. The mountain's name was in local use when first published in 1960 by the U.S. Geological Survey. Several landforms in the vicinity bear this Taku name, which all ultimately derive from the Taku people. The first ascent was made in 1949 by Forbes, Merritt, and Schoeblen via the west ridge. Daniel Reid and party made the first ascent of the difficult east face of South Taku Tower in 1973.

Climate

Based on the Köppen climate classification, Taku Towers is located in a subpolar oceanic climate zone, with long, cold, snowy winters, and cool summers. Weather systems coming off the Gulf of Alaska are forced upwards by the Coast Mountains (orographic lift), causing heavy precipitation in the form of rainfall and snowfall. Winter temperatures can drop below −20 °C with wind chill factors below −30 °C. The month of July offers the most favorable weather to view or climb Taku Towers.

See also

Geospatial summary of the High Peaks/Summits of the Juneau Icefield
Geography of Alaska
Cathedral Peak

References

External links
 Taku Towers weather forecast
 Climbing Taku Towers: YouTube
 Taku Towers east aspect: Flickr photo
 Aerial view from north: Flickr photo

Mountains of Alaska
Mountains of Juneau, Alaska
Boundary Ranges
North American 2000 m summits